Iglseebach is a small river of Bavaria, Germany. It flows into the Swabian Rezat near Pleinfeld.

See also
List of rivers of Bavaria

Rivers of Bavaria
Weißenburg-Gunzenhausen
Rivers of Germany